Whitehead Bros. Are an American R&B duo from Philadelphia, Pennsylvania, made up of two brothers, Kenny Whitehead and the late John Whitehead Jr. Who contributed hits such as ‘Your ‘Love Is A 187’ from their 1994 Motown release, Serious. Their second single from the Serious LP, entitled Forget I Was A G, also appeared in the Jason’s Lyric Soundtrack in addition to being synced in the film numerous times. Their music is still popular today and celebrated on a great scale internationally. They are sons of the late [[John Whitehead (singer/song writer/producer)|John Whitehead] Who penned multiple hits for The Gamble and Huff, ‘Philly Sound’, as well as performing and co-writing with his partner Gene McFadden, the well known smash, Ain’t No Stoppin’ Us Now ].

Discography

Albums

Singles

References

External links
 
 
 

American boy bands
Musical groups from Philadelphia
American rhythm and blues musical groups
Family musical groups
American musical duos